Lucius Lee Hubbard (August 7, 1849 – August 3, 1933) was an American geologist. He served as State Geologist of Michigan from 1893 to 1899 and on the Board of Regents of the University of Michigan.

Biography
Hubbard was born on August 7, 1849, in Cincinnati, Ohio, and was the only child of Lucius  Virgilius and Annie Elizabeth (Lee) Hubbard.

From 1891 to 1893, Hubbard was the Assistant State Geologist of Michigan under Marshman E. Wadsworth. When Wadsworth resigned as State Geologist of Michigan in 1893, Hubbard was appointed to the position. Hubbard reorganized the Geological Survey and discontinued its ties to the Michigan College of Mines and the University of Michigan. He resigned the position in 1899, dissatisfied with the Survey and obstacles to his work.

Following his tenure with the Survey, Hubbard served as general manager of the Copper Range Mining Co. and the Champion Copper Co., and later as president of the Ojibway Mining Co. In 1903, the two-story Hubbard House was built for him at 31 Hubbard Avenue in Painesdale, Michigan, though he only lived there for two years. In 1905, he was appointed to the Board of Control of the Michigan College of Mines, a post he held until 1917. In 1910, he was appointed to the Board of Regents of the University of Michigan, and was elected in 1911 and each year afterward until 1933.

In his later years, Hubbard was a snowbird, living in Florida during the winter and Michigan's Keweenaw Peninsula in summer. On August 3, 1933, Hubbard died in Eagle Harbor, Michigan.

Hubbard collected a large library of Americana, portions of which were sold in 1914 and 1935.

Notes

References

External links
http://www.michigan.gov/documents/deq/GIMDL-GGHIST_313569_7.pdf
http://www.minrec.org/labels.asp?colid=1121
http://books.google.com/books?id=afEUAAAAYAAJ&pg=PT437&lpg=PT437&dq=Lucius+Virgilius+hubbard&source=bl&ots=I-wnmmGpCd&sig=JdU_yJkd6_X_TlPFta1YuSDcGyw&hl=en&sa=X&ei=mNC3UMD_J4jQ2AX82IFo&ved=0CDYQ6AEwAzgK
http://query.nytimes.com/mem/archive-free/pdf?res=F20612FC3C5E13738DDDAF0894DD405B848DF1D3
http://www.loc.gov/resource/g3730.ct003207/
http://query.nytimes.com/mem/archive-free/pdf?res=FB0E15FD355810738DDDA00994DB405B828EF1D3
http://select.nytimes.com/gst/abstract.html?res=F50614FD345D14738DDDAC0894D0405B888EF1D3 
http://select.nytimes.com/gst/abstract.html?res=FA0816FA355B107A93C3AA1788D85F418385F9 
http://select.nytimes.com/gst/abstract.html?res=F70A13FD3458177A93C6A9178FD85F418385F9 
http://query.nytimes.com/mem/archive-free/pdf?res=F1061FFD3C5E13738DDDA10894DD405B848DF1D3
http://books.google.com/books?id=NPOglEdojlkC&pg=PA176&dq=%22Lucius+L.+hubbard%22&hl=en&sa=X&ei=pR8kUdGUEPDDyQG8r4GQBw&ved=0CEIQ6AEwBDgU#v=onepage&q=%22Lucius%20L.%20hubbard%22&f=false

1849 births
1933 deaths
People from Cincinnati